Amanita smithiana, also known as Smith's amanita, is a species of agaric found on soil in coniferous (Abies, Tsuga, Pseudotsuga) and broadleaved (Alnus, Quercus) woodland in the Pacific Northwest of North America. It fruits in August and September.

Taxonomy
Amanita smithiana was described by Dutch mycologist Cornelis Bas in 1969. The specific epithet honors mycologist Alexander H. Smith, who collected the type specimens from Washington in 1941. It belongs in the subgenus Lepidella.

Description
Spores are ellipsoid to elongated, amyloid, and measure 11–12.5 by 7–8 µm.

Toxicity
It is responsible for poisonings in the Pacific Northwest when mistaken for the edible and sought after Tricholoma murrillianum. It causes initial gastrointestinal symptoms that manifest 1 to 12 hours after eating the mushrooms, followed by acute nephritis after a delay of 2–6 days. Hemodialysis appears to be an effective treatment and most patients recover normal kidney function within several weeks of ingestion.

It is thought that Amanita smithiana nephrotoxicity is from chlorocrotylglycine and allenic norleucine.

Several similar species have been implicated in similar cases of poisoning: A. sphaerobulbosa, A. thiersii, A. proxima, (Spain) and A. pseudoporphyria (Japan).

See also

List of Amanita species

References

External links 

smithiana
Poisonous fungi
Fungi of Canada
Fungi of the United States
Fungi described in 1969
Fungi without expected TNC conservation status